Lendita Zeqiraj is a film director from Kosovo. 

She was born in Prishtina, Kosovo. Her sister is filmmaker Blerta Zeqiri.

In 2008, she released the short film Balcony. In 2018, her short film Fence ("Gardhi") won Best International Short Film at DokuFest. It also won Best Narrative Short at the Hamptons International Film Festival and the New Orleans Film Festival.

Her debut feature film, Aga's House, is about a young boy looking for his father and about trauma and rape survivors, set after the Kosovo War.

References

Year of birth missing (living people)
Living people